Rimantas "Rimas" Kaukėnas (born 11 April 1977) is a Lithuanian former professional basketball player. His long career has taken him to a number of countries, finding the most success in Italy. He has also been a member of the senior men's Lithuanian national team. Playing primarily at the shooting guard position, he can also play as a point guard.

Professional career
Kaukėnas was a longtime member of Montepaschi Siena of the Italian Serie A.

On 5 August 2012 he signed for his homeland team Žalgiris Kaunas.

He joined Grissin Bon Reggio Emilia in December 2013, helping the side reach the finals of the 2014–15 Lega Basket Serie A. In July 2015, his contract was extended for another season. On 7 July 2016 Kaukėnas retired from professional basketball. On 7 January 2017 Kaukėnas came out of retirement and rejoined Grissin Bon Reggio Emilia for the rest of the season.

National team
Kaukėnas played with the senior men's Lithuanian national basketball team at the EuroBasket 2001, the EuroBasket 2007, where he won a bronze medal, and the EuroBasket 2011. He also played at both the 2008 Summer Olympics and the 2012 Summer Olympics.

Personal life
Kaukėnas established the Rimantas Kaukenas Charity Group, which aims to provide "magical moments" for children with life-threatening medical conditions.
He is married with former Swedish-Serbian basketball player Tanja Kostić, with whom he has three daughters. Tanja follows the activities of RK Charity Group, while Rimantas is playing during the season.
He is fluent in English, Italian and Russian.

EuroLeague career statistics

|-
| style="text-align:left;"| 2005–06
| style="text-align:left;"| Montepaschi Siena
| 14 || 12 || 28.5 || .442 || .302 || .847 || 1.9 || 2.0 || 1.7 || .0 || 15.1 || 12.9
|-
| style="text-align:left;"| 2007–08
| style="text-align:left;"| Montepaschi Siena
| 9 || 5 || 28.8 || .431 || .290 || .882 || 2.6 || 2.6 || 1.6 || .1 || 14.1 || 13.6
|-
| style="text-align:left;"| 2008–09
| style="text-align:left;"| Montepaschi Siena
| 18 || 5 || 28.8 || .518 || .368 || .847 || 2.3 || 1.7 || 1.1 || .0 || 14.8 || 12.8
|-
| style="text-align:left;"| 2009–10
| style="text-align:left;"| Real Madrid
| 18 || 10 || 21.4 || .545 || .353 || .829 || 1.1 || 1.3 || 1.6 || .0 || 10.3 || 8.1
|-
| style="text-align:left;"| 2010–11
| style="text-align:left;"| Montepaschi Siena
| 20 || 11 || 25.3 || .445 || .308 || .902 || 2.0 || 1.9 || 1.1 || .1 || 12.0 || 9.6
|-
| style="text-align:left;"| 2011–12
| style="text-align:left;"| Montepaschi Siena
| 6 || 6 || 25.3 || .580 || .643 || 1.000 || 2.2 || 2.5 || 1.2 || .0 || 14.5 || 15.3
|-
| style="text-align:left;"| 2012–13
| style="text-align:left;"| Žalgiris Kaunas
| 24 || 11 || 20.3 || .395 || .344 || .882 || 2.1 || 1.9 || .8 || .0 || 7.8 || 6.4
|-
| style="text-align:left;"| 2013–14
| style="text-align:left;"| Laboral Kutxa
| 5 || 1 || 12.3 || .583 || .000 || 1.000 || 1.4 || 1.0 || .6 || .2 || 3.6 || 3.8
|-
|- class="sortbottom"
| style="text-align:left;"| Career
| style="text-align:left;"|
| 114 || 61 || 23.8 || .510 || .337 || .874 || 1.9 || 1.8 || 1.0 || .0 || 11.6 || 10.2

Awards and achievements

 Lithuanian League Champion: 2002
 North European League Champion: 2002
 German League All-Star Game MVP: 2004
 Eurobasket.com's German League Player of the Year: 2004
 Italian League MVP Runner Up: 2005
 2× Italian SuperCup Winner: 2007, 2008
 Italian League MVP Runner Up: 2007
 4× Italian League Champion: 2007, 2008, 2009, 2011
 Italian League Finals MVP: 2007
 EuroBasket 2007: 
 EuroLeague 3rd Place: 2008
 His number 13 was retired by Montepaschi Siena in 2009.

References

External links
 Euroleague Profile
 Serie A Profile 
 Liga ACB Profile  
 FIBA.com Video Interview with Rimantas Kaukėnas

1977 births
Living people
Basketball players at the 2008 Summer Olympics
Basketball players at the 2012 Summer Olympics
BC Rytas players
BC Oostende players
Lithuanian expatriate basketball people in Belgium
Lithuanian expatriate basketball people in Israel
Hapoel Galil Elyon players
Israeli Basketball Premier League players
Lega Basket Serie A players
Liga ACB players
Lithuanian expatriate basketball people in Germany
Lithuanian expatriate basketball people in Italy
Lithuanian expatriate basketball people in Spain
Lithuanian expatriate basketball people in the United States
Lithuanian men's basketball players
Mens Sana Basket players
Olympic basketball players of Lithuania
Pallacanestro Cantù players
Pallacanestro Reggiana players
Real Madrid Baloncesto players
Saski Baskonia players
Seton Hall Pirates men's basketball players
Shooting guards
Basketball players from Vilnius
Telekom Baskets Bonn players